Group A of the 2005 Fed Cup Europe/Africa Zone Group II was one of two pools in the Europe/Africa Zone Group II of the 2005 Fed Cup. Four teams competed in a round robin competition, with the top two teams and the bottom two teams proceeding to their respective sections of the play-offs: the top teams play for advancement to Group I, while the bottom teams face potential relegation to Group III.

Finland vs. Lithuania

Romania vs. Tunisia

Finland vs. Romania

Lithuania vs. Tunisia

Finland vs. Tunisia

Romania vs. Lithuania

See also
Fed Cup structure

References

External links
 Fed Cup website

2005 Fed Cup Europe/Africa Zone